Half Light may refer to:

 Effective radius or half-light radius
 Half Light (film), a 2006 British mystery-horror drama
 Half-Light (album), by Rostam, 2017
 "Half Light" (Athlete song), 2005
 "Half Light" (Wilkinson song), 2014
 Half-light: Collected Poems 1965–2016, by Frank Bidart, 2017
 "Half Light", a song by Porcupine Tree from Deadwing
 "Half Light I" and Half Light II (No Celebration)", songs by Arcade Fire from The Suburbs